Hermann Gonçalves Schatzmayr (May 11, 1936 – June 21, 2010) was a Brazilian virologist and researcher of Austrian descent. He was the head of the Department of Virology at the Instituto Oswaldo Cruz (IOC / Fiocruz) for 30 years and was the president of the institution from 1990 to 1992. He was one of the most important virologists from Brazil.

References

1936 births
2010 deaths
Brazilian virologists
Brazilian people of Austrian descent
Deaths from multiple organ failure